Abrahami is a surname or a patronymic derived from the given name Abraham. Notable people with this surname or patronymic include:
Natalie Abrahami,  British theatre, film and opera director
Avishai Abrahami, Nadav Abrahami, founders of Wix.com, Israeli software company, providing cloud-based web development services
Arshak Abrahami Fetvadjian or Arshak Fetvadjian, Armenian artist, painter and designer

Patronymic surnames